Yamako (variants:  Yamagatock; Yumagatock) is a former Maidu village in Nevada County, California, that was located  east of Nevada City.

References

Former settlements in Nevada County, California
Former populated places in California
Maidu villages